The  was a restaurant and historic museum of curry in the Isezakichō district of the port city of Yokohama, Japan, between 2001 and 2007. Different types of curry were available from a selection or restaurants, ranging from a full meal to a quick taste option.

The museum included a recreation of Yokohama's port in the late 19th century. Exhibits lined the walls and part of the central area built in the form of a ship at port. On the eighth floor there was a recreated cabin with Morse code radio instruments.

Operated by Matahari Co., Ltd., the museum opened on 26 January 2001, and closed on 31 March 2007. By the end of November 2006, a total of 8.7 million visitors had visited the museum.

See also

 List of food and beverage museums

References

External links
 Official website 
 Matahari Co., Ltd. official website 

Museums in Yokohama
Food museums in Japan
Defunct museums in Japan
Restaurants in Japan
Curry
Museums established in 2001
2001 establishments in Japan
Museums disestablished in 2007
2007 disestablishments in Japan